Ischnochiton elongatus, the lengthened chiton or elongate chiton, is a species of chiton in the family Ischnochitonidae.

Subspecies
 Ischnochiton elongatus elongatus (Blainville, 1825)
 Ischnochiton elongatus crispus (Reeve, 1847)

Description
These medium-sized chitons are long oval shaped, with radiating, noduled ribs on the front valve  and rows of bumps on the front edge.

Distribution
This species can be found in Australia (New South Wales, South Australia, Western Australia).

Habitat
It lives intertidally and subtidally under rocks and stones.

References

Ischnochitonidae
Chitons described in 1825